Travis and Bob were an American rock and roll duo from Jackson, Alabama, United States. Its members were Travis Wilbon Pritchett (March 18, 1939, Jackson – October 18, 2010, Mobile) and Bob Weaver (born July 27, 1939, Jackson).

In 1959, they released a single on the independent label Sandy Records called "Tell Him No", which was written by Pritchett. Dot Records picked up the single for nationwide distribution, and it became a hit, reaching No. 21 on the Billboard R&B charts and No. 8 on the Billboard Hot 100. Despite recording further singles for Big Top Records and Mercury Records, the duo never had another hit single.

In June 1960, the duo filed a lawsuit against Sandy founders Johnny Bozeman and Paul DuBose. Travis and Bob claimed they did not receive royalties from airplay and sales of their recordings.

Pritchett died on October 18, 2010 at a Mobile hospital, at age 71.

References

American musical duos
Rock music groups from Alabama
Rock music duos
Rock and roll music groups
People from Jackson, Alabama
1939 births
Living people